Osher may refer to:
Osher (name)
Osher Lifelong Learning Institutes
Osher Center for Integrative Medicine